is a former Japanese football player.

Playing career
Tajima was born in Shizuoka Prefecture on June 27, 1974. After graduating from Shimizu Higashi High School, he joined his local club Shimizu S-Pulse in 1993. He played forward and offensive midfielder. However he could not play many matches at the club. In 1997, he moved to Japan Football League club Honda. He played many matches in 3 season. In 2000, he moved to Japan Football League (JFL) club Yokohama FC. He played as regular player and the club won the champions in 2000 and was promoted to J2 League. In 2003, he moved to JFL club Sagawa Express Tokyo. However he could not play at all in the match and retired end of 2003 season.

Club statistics

References

External links

geocities.jp

1974 births
Living people
Association football people from Shizuoka Prefecture
Japanese footballers
J1 League players
J2 League players
Japan Football League (1992–1998) players
Japan Football League players
Shimizu S-Pulse players
Honda FC players
Yokohama FC players
Sagawa Shiga FC players
Association football forwards